Calvert Kenroy Hooper (born 10 August 1982) is a cricketer who has played one One Day International for Canada.

External links 

1982 births
Living people
Canada One Day International cricketers
Canadian cricketers
Saint Vincent and the Grenadines cricketers
Saint Vincent and the Grenadines emigrants to Canada